Alona Regional Council (Mo'atza Azorit Alona) is a regional council in northern Israel. It is part of Haifa District and covers three moshavim, Amikam, Aviel and Givat Nili. The council's headquarters are located in Amikam. The emblem is inscribed with Biblical words from : "Those who sow in tears, will reap with songs of joy."

History
The council was created for the three Mishkei Herut Beitar-affiliated moshavim due to ideological differences with other settlements, most of which were affiliated with Labor Zionism movements.

References

 
Regional councils in Israel
Regional councils in Haifa District